The  is a 4-laned toll road in Aichi, Japan. It is managed by Aichi Prefectural Road Public Corporation.

Overview

Officially the road is designated as Aichi Prefectural Route 265 (Handa-Chūō Junction to Tokoname Interchange) and Aichi Prefectural Route 522 (Tokoname Interchange to Rinkū Interchange). Together with the Chubu International Airport Connecting Road, it is also referred to as the Centrair Line to indicate its status as the access road for Chubu Centrair International Airport.

The design standard of the road is similar to most national expressways in Japan.

Interchange list

 IC - interchange, JCT - junction

References

External links 

 Aichi Prefectural Road Public Corporation

Toll roads in Japan